This is a timeline of women's suffrage in Alaska. White women in Alaska had the right to vote in school board elections starting in 1904. In 1913, the first Territorial Legislature passed the Shoup Suffrage Bill which gave white women the right to vote in all elections. Alaska Native women had a longer road fighting for their right to vote. First, they had to be declared citizens of the United States, but even after that happened in 1924, additional barriers were put in place. These included literacy tests and segregation. The Voting Rights Act of 1965 helped remove many barriers that Alaska Natives faced in exercising their right to vote.

20th century

1900s 
1904

 Alaska women are given the right to vote in school board elections.

1910s 
1912

 Representative Frank W. Mondell adds an amendment to a bill making Alaska an American Territory that would allow the territorial legislature to legislate equal suffrage for women.
Cornelia Templeton Hatcher drafts a petition to the territorial legislature of Alaska for women's suffrage.
Nellie Cashman is the first woman to vote in Alaska.
The Alaska Native Brotherhood (ANB) is formed.
1913

 The Shoup Woman Suffrage bill is passed in 1913, giving women the right to vote in Alaska if they are considered United States citizens.
March 21: The Shoup Suffrage bill is signed into law.
1915

 The Alaska Native Sisterhood (ANS) is formed.
Alaska Natives are allowed to vote if they give up "tribal customs and traditions."

1920s 
1924

 The Indian Citizenship Act is passed.
1925

 Alaska passes a literacy test to suppress the vote of Alaska Natives.

1940s 
1943

 Chinese Americans are able to vote after the passage of the Magnuson Act.

1945

 Alaska anti-discrimination law ends segregation of Native Alaskans.

1950s 
1950

 The Anchorage League of Women Voters (LWV) is formed.

1959

 The new state of Alaska has a more lenient literacy test.

1960s 
1965

 The Voting Rights Act (VRA) is passed which helps remove many voting barriers to Native Alaskans.
1967

 The statewide LWV is formed.

1970s 
1970
 Literacy tests are ended in Alaska.
1975

 The VRA is modified to provide voting information in Native languages.

See also 

 List of Alaska suffragists
 Women's suffrage in Alaska
 Women's suffrage in states of the United States
 Women's suffrage in the United States

References

Sources 

 

Alaska suffrage
Politics of Alaska
Timelines of states of the United States
Suffrage referendums
American suffragists
History of women's rights in the United States
History of women in Alaska